Oakwood Hospital in Barming Heath near Maidstone, England was a psychiatric hospital founded in 1833 as the Kent County Lunatic Asylum. Following transfer of services to Maidstone Hospital, Oakwood closed in 1994 and was then developed as a residential estate known as St Andrew's Park.

History

Construction and expansion
The Oakwood Hospital was founded as the "Kent County Lunatic Asylum" in 1833. It was designed as one building, commonly referred to as St Andrew's House, using an early corridor design by the surveyor to the County of Kent, John Whichcord Snr (who also designed Maidstone County Gaol). It was erected between 1829 and 1833 on a site in Barming Heath, just to the west of Maidstone. The asylum was intended to take in patients from across the entire county of Kent, which then stretched as far west as Greenwich. The first 168 patients were admitted in 1833.

As the asylum expanded, additions and extensions were made to this building until it had reached maximum potential capacity. In 1850 an additional building, known as The Queen's House, was built on newly acquired land at the site. This building was also designed by the architect John Whichcord Snr.

In the mid-nineteenth century, the superintendent of the asylum was Dr James Huxley (1821-1907), the elder brother of Thomas Henry Huxley, the evolutionary biologist and friend of Charles Darwin.

Further expansion took place between 1867 and 1872 with the building of the third asylum block (also known as the Hermitage Block).

On 29 November 1957, a fire broke out in the tailor's workshop on the first floor of one of the buildings. The fire brigade was called at 06:40 and arrived four minutes later. Six pumps attended and the 350 patients in that wing were evacuated. By 08:00 the fire was out, and the clearing-up process began. At 10:00, the tower collapsed, killing three firemen, two nursing staff, the hospital printer and a patient and injuring a number of people.

Closure and redevelopment
Following the introduction of Care in the Community in the early 1980s and also the transfer of some services to Maidstone Hospital, Oakwood Hospital then became known as the Maidstone Hospital (Psychiatric Wing). The hospital closed completely in 1994. St Andrew's House, the Queen's House, the Beeches (formerly the Superintendent's House), and the two lodges were all Grade II listed buildings and so were all subsequently converted for residential use.

Gallery

Other notes
The word 'barmy' (meaning 'mad' or 'foolish') is popularly said to come from 'Barming' with allusion to the Hospital, but the Oxford English Dictionary records that it stems from the Old English word 'barm' meaning 'froth on fermenting malt'.

See also
 Healthcare in Kent

References

Notes

Bibliography
A History Of Oakwood Hospital 1828-1982 Kent County Council 
Queen's House, Oakwood Hospital: Building Investigation Oxford Archaeological Unit 1998
St Andrew's House, Oakwood Hospital: Historic Buildings Report Oxford Archaeological Unit 2002
Archive collection held at the Centre For Kentish Studies in Maidstone

External links 

1988 disestablishments
Defunct hospitals in England
Former psychiatric hospitals in England
Grade II listed buildings in Kent
History of Kent
Hospitals established in 1833
Hospitals in Kent
Buildings and structures in Maidstone